Baynton may refer to:

Places
Baynton, Victoria
Baynton House, Coulston, Wiltshire, England
Baynton and Baynton West, suburbs of Karratha, Western Australia

Other uses
Baynton (surname)

See also
 Bayntun (disambiguation)